Tissue tropism is the range of cells and tissues of a host that support growth of a particular pathogen, such as a virus, bacterium or parasite.

Some bacteria and viruses have a broad tissue tropism and can infect many types of cells and tissues. Other viruses may infect primarily a single tissue. For example, rabies virus affects primarily neuronal tissue.

Influencing factors
Factors influencing viral tissue tropism include:

 The presence of cellular receptors permitting viral entry.
 Availability of transcription factors involved in viral replication.
 The molecular nature of the viral tropogen or virus surface, such as the glycoprotein, which interacts with the corresponding cell receptor.

The cellular receptors are the proteins found on a cell or viral surface.  These receptors are like keys, allowing the viral cell to fuse with or attach itself to a cell.  The way that these proteins are acquired is through a similar process to that of an infection cycle.

How 'tropic' tissue is acquired

Tissue tropism develops in the following stages: 

 Virus with GPX enters body (where GP - glycoprotein and X is the numeric value given to the GP)
 Viral cell "targets" cell with a GPX receptors
 Viral cell fuses with the host cell and inserts its contents into the host cell
 Reverse transcription occurs
 Viral DNA is incorporated with host DNA via viral enzyme
 Production of RNA and viral protein
 Viral particle is assembled
 Viral particle buds out of the cell, taking a chunk of the cell membrane with it and acquiring a new tissue with all the receptors it needs to continue tissue tropism

Example: HIV has a gp120, which is precisely what the CD4 marker is on the surface of the macrophages and T cells. Thus HIV can enter T cells and macrophages

See also
 Host tropism
Endothelial Cell Tropism

References

Virology